Khairbandha Dam, is an earthfill dam on Fattepur river near Gondia in State of Maharashtra in India.

Specifications

Purpose
 Irrigation

See also
 Dams in Maharashtra
 List of reservoirs and dams in India

References

Dams in Gondia district
Dams completed in 1903
1903 establishments in India